This is a list of seasons played by Hereford United in English football from their formation in 1924 until their liquidation in 2014.

Seasons 

(* ) combined stats from the Keys Cup (finished 9th) and the League Cup (finished 5th).

3 points deducted from season 2010–11; season 2014–15 records and statistics expunged on 5 January 2015

Key 

Pos = Final position
P = Played
W = Games won
D = Games drawn
L = Games lost
F = Goals for
A = Goals against
Pts = Points

Second = Football League Second Division
Third = Football League Third Division
FL1 = Football League One
Fourth = Football League Fourth Division
Div 3 = Football League Division Three
FL2 = Football League Two
Conf = Conference National
SFL-P = Southern League Premier Division
SFL-1 = Southern League Division One
SFL-R = Southern League Regional North-West
SFL = Southern League
BHML = Birmingham & District League
BHMC = Birmingham Combination

EX = Extra preliminary round
PR = preliminary round
1Q = First qualifying round
2Q = Second qualifying round
3Q = Third qualifying round
4Q = Fourth qualifying round
R1 = First round
R2 = Second round
R3 = Third round
R4 = Fourth round
R5 = Fifth round
QF = Quarter-finals
SF = Semi-finals
AF = Area final
F = Final

Hereford United
Seasons
 
Herefordshire F.C.